The Mount Yuntai is a mountain in Nangan Township, Lienchiang County, Taiwan.

Geology
The mountain stands at a height of 248 meters above sea level. It is the highest point in Nangan.

Architecture
At the top of the mountain, there is an observatory platform to view the ocean and the nearby Beijiao Peninsula. It is also being used as a military intelligence building.

See also
 List of tourist attractions in Taiwan
 List of mountains in Taiwan

References

Geography of Lienchiang County
Yuntai
Nangang Township
Tourist attractions in Lienchiang County